Benson Glacier is a glacier about  long, draining the eastern part of Flight Deck Neve and continuing east between Fry Glacier and Mackay Glacier into the northern part of Granite Harbour where it forms a floating tongue. It was mapped in 1957 by the New Zealand Northern Survey Party of the Commonwealth Trans-Antarctic Expedition (1956–58), and indicated as a somewhat longer glacier including the present Midship Glacier. It was named by the party after W.N. Benson, formerly professor of geology at the University of Otago, New Zealand, whose publications include a major contribution to the petrology of Victoria Land.

See also 
Red Buttress Peak

References 

Glaciers of Scott Coast